Kálmán Sóvári (September 12, 1910 – December 18, 1996) was a Hungarian wrestler who competed in two Olympic games in 1936 and 1948. He competed in the 1936 Summer Olympics in Men's Freestyle Welterweight, but did not win a medal. At the 1948 Summer Olympics, he participated in the same event and placed 5th. He was born in Szombathely and died in Budapest.

His son, Kálmán Sóvári played on two FIFA World Cups as a football player.

References

External links
 

1910 births
1996 deaths
Hungarian male sport wrestlers
Olympic wrestlers of Hungary
Wrestlers at the 1936 Summer Olympics
Wrestlers at the 1948 Summer Olympics
Sportspeople from Szombathely
20th-century Hungarian people